Kissing Cousins may refer to:

Kissin' Cousins, a 1964 musical comedy film that stars Elvis Presley
Kissin' Cousins (album), a soundtrack album from the 1964 film
Kissing Cousins (film), a 2008 American romantic comedy film
Kissing cousins, relatives or friends with whom one is on close enough terms to greet with a kiss.
Kissing Cousins (Full House episode), an episode of the television series Full House
Kissing Cousins, a season 4 episode of the television series The Nanny
Kissing Cousin, a season 10 episode of the television series Frasier
Kissing Cousins. An Interpretation of British and American Culture, 1945-1975, a book by Daniel Snowman

See also
 Kissing Cousin (horse), a Thoroughbred racehorse
 Cousin marriage
 List of coupled cousins